Pivarník (feminine Pivarníková) is a Slovak surname. Notable people include: 

 Angelina Pivarnick (born 1986), American television personality
 Ján Pivarník (born 1947), Slovak football player and manager
 Roman Pivarník (born 1967), Slovak football player and manager, son of Ján 

Slovak-language surnames